Józef Murgot was a Polish youth association football coach, creator of Zryw Chorzów, one of the best academies in the history of Polish football. Among the players who began their careers under his supervision, were such stars as Jan Banaś, Erwin Wilczek, Zygfryd Szołtysik, Józef Janduda, and Antoni Piechniczek. Zryw's academy, led by Murgot, was twice Under-19 Champion of Poland, in 1960 and 1961.

Born in Chropaczów, a district of Świętochłowice, Murgot in his teen years played football in the team of Czarni Chropaczów. After World War II, he became a physical education teacher at Mining Vocational High School (Technikum Górnicze) in Chorzów. In 1953, he was named coach of the first football youth academy in Poland. Zryw Chorzów, as the academy was called, became an incubator of football talents in the region of Upper Silesia. Practices took place in the district of Klimzowiec, and Murgot was the coach, the manager, and the janitor of the academy. Due to the fact that he continued teaching at the high school, he was called Professor by the young players. As Zygfryd Sołtysik later recalled, Murgot would organize football games between teams of different Upper Silesian schools, looking for talents among young participants. According to Jan Banaś, Murgot went so far as to cook dinners for his young players

In the early 1960s Zryw Chorzów emerged as top academy of Poland. Its U-19 team twice won national championship (1960, 1961). In the 1961 Polish U-19 final, Zryw defeated 10-1 the U-19 team of Górnik Wałbrzych, and soon afterwards, several Zryw's players were called into Polish Under-18 National Team. In the 1961 UEFA European Under-18 Championship, Poland, with two Zryw players in the lineup (Szołtysik and Janduda), won silver.

Józef Murgot continued his work until the 1970s. He died on 31 August 1987 and was buried at the Chropaczów Municipal Cemetery.

References 

People from Świętochłowice
1987 deaths
Year of birth missing
Polish footballers
Sportspeople from Silesian Voivodeship
Association footballers not categorized by position